Henry Wigstead (died 1800) was an English Magistrate, publisher, businessman, amateur painter & caricaturist.

He was a patron and close personal friend of Thomas Rowlandson, whom he accompanied on sketching trips to the Isle of Wight (1784), Brighton (1789) and Wales (1787) which resulted in subsequent publications for which Rowlandson provided the illustrations.

Wigstead exhibited at the RA exhibition of 1785. His style appears to be close to Rowlandson, who create prints of many of his works, often signing them as Wigstead.

Wigstead also ran a successful interior decorating business and in June 1788 was appointed "House painter to His Royal Highness the Prince of Wales". His company  worked on the Royal Pavilion for the Prince of Wales (the future George IV)When George III became incapacitated, the Prince hired Wigstead to distribute satirical caricatures across England attacking the king and those in William Pitt the Younger's cabinet who the Prince believed were frustrating his claim to the Regency. Although Wigstead's name was associated with these prints, the recent discovery of payments to Thomas Rowlandson confirm that his friend was the actual artist. Wigstead died at Margate.

Works 
 Wigstead, H & Rowlandson T :	An Excursion to Brighthelmstone, made in the year 1789, by Henry Wigstead and Thomas Rowlandson, with eight engravings by TR Geo and J.Robinson, London, 1790
 Wigstead, H: Remarks on a Tour to North and South Wales in the year 1797 by Henry Wigstead - 	W.Wigstead, London, 1800

References

External links
 Henry Wigstead (British Museum Bio)

English caricaturists
English cartoonists
English illustrators
People from Margate
1800 deaths
Year of birth unknown